Cowboy Bebop is a 2021 American science fiction streaming television series. It is a live action series based on the 1998 Japanese anime television series of the same name and the 2001 Japanese anime film of the same name. Set in the year 2171, the series focuses on the adventures of a ragtag group of bounty hunters chasing down criminals across the Solar System on the Bebop spaceship.

The series was developed by Christopher Yost, with André Nemec serving as showrunner, and stars John Cho, Mustafa Shakir, Daniella Pineda, Elena Satine, and Alex Hassell. The 10-episode series was released on Netflix on 19 November 2021, and drew criticism from both fans and critics for its writing, special effects, editing and action sequences, but was praised for its cast. Shinichirō Watanabe, the original series' creator, has publicly criticized the show for being disloyal to the source material. On 9 December 2021, Netflix cancelled the series after only one season.

Cast and characters

Main 
 John Cho as Spike Spiegel (aka "Fearless"): a bounty hunter born on Mars with a history of violent gang activity and extensive fist-fighting and marksmanship abilities. For the role, Cho grew out his hair to mimic Spike's look from the anime. The anime director, Shinichirō Watanabe, explained in Cowboy Bebop: The Movie DVD extra that Spike was originally based on Yūsaku Matsuda, a Japanese-Korean actor.
 Mustafa Shakir as Jet Black: Spike's partner, former ISSP detective, and captain of the Bebop, who has a cybernetic arm. He spent five years in prison over a wrongful conviction.
 Daniella Pineda as Faye Valentine: a bounty hunter who woke up without her memories after being revived from cryosleep.
 Elena Satine as Julia: a femme fatale who is as smart as she is beautiful. She has a complicated past with Spike and Vicious and is the object of both of their affections.
 Alex Hassell as Vicious: Spike's nemesis, a power-hungry gangster from the Red Dragon Crime Syndicate who was Spike's closest friend before they had a falling out.
Additionally, Welsh Corgi dog actors Charlie and Harry play Ein, a dog with special abilities.

Recurring 
 Tamara Tunie as Ana: The proprietor of an underground jazz club on Mars who acts as a surrogate mother to Spike.
 Mason Alexander Park as Gren: A jazz musician working for Ana, who is also Ana's right-hand. The character was reimagined as non-binary for the show.
 Ira Munn and Lucy Currey as Punch and Judy: The duo hosts of Big Shot, a bounty hunter public program.
 Geoff Stults as Chalmers: A detective in the Intra Solar System Police (ISSP) who is married to Jet's ex-wife.
 Carmel McGlone as Woodcock: Jet's informant.
 Rachel House as Mao: A crime boss who leads the Syndicate's "White Tigers" family.
 Ann Truong and Hoa Xuande as Shin and Lin: Twin siblings employed as Vicious' enforcers.
 John Noble as Caliban: One of the three Elders who control the Red Dragon Crime Syndicate.

Guest 
 Jan Uddin and Lydia Peckham as Asimov and Katerina Solensan: A romantic couple on the run from the law hoping for a big score to secure their future.
 Cali Nelle as Abdul Hakim: A thief and killer who uses a "face-changer" to hide his true appearance.
 Nathaniel Lees as the Sushi Chef: Spike's informant.
 Adrienne Barbeau as Maria Murdock: An eco-fascist mastermind who will go to extremes to protect nature.
 Matthias Luafutu as Udai Taxim: A fugitive connected to Jet's past career as a detective.
 Wade Williams as Fad: Jet's ex-partner in the ISSP.
 Jade Harlow as Mel: A mechanic hired by Jet to repair the Bebop and its aging engine, who has a brief romantic fling with Faye.
 Sinead Fitzgerald as Holo-Beatrice: A computer generated receptionist who is the face of The Londes Centre
 Josh Randall as Pierrot Le Fou: An assassin whose sanity was damaged from intensive scientific experimentation, leaving him with the mindset of a sadistic child.
 Rodney Cook as the voice of the Teddy Bomber: A terrorist who uses explosive teddy bears to rebel against the government and what he views as a corrupt capitalist society.
 Christine Dunford as Whitney Haggis Matsumoto: A con artist posing as Faye's "mother", who found her while she was still in cryo-sleep. The character was originally male in the anime.
 Tyson Ritter as The Iron Mink: A notorious intergalactic arms dealer who is secretly married to Whitney.
 James Hiroyuki Liao as Tanaka
 Eden Perkins as Radical Ed: A hyperactive child prodigy skilled in hacking.

Additionally, Blessing Mokgohloa portrays Santiago, and Molly Moriarty plays Kimmie Black, Jet's daughter.

Episodes

Production

Development 
On June 6, 2017, it was announced that an American live action adaptation of Cowboy Bebop was being developed for television by Tomorrow Studios—a partnership between Marty Adelstein and ITV Studios, alongside Sunrise Inc., which also produced the original anime—with Christopher Yost serving as the series writer. On November 27, 2018, Netflix announced that the live action series would be heading to its streaming service. One of the Tomorrow Studios' producers, André Nemec, was appointed as the showrunner who previously discovered the anime through his brother around 2011. In an interview with Vanity Fair on October 26, 2021, Yost said he had already started planning a second season for the series before writing the first season, which is something Nemec also hinted at. However, on December 9, 2021, Netflix canceled the series after one season.

Casting 
On April 4, 2019, Variety reported that John Cho, Mustafa Shakir, Daniella Pineda and Alex Hassell were all cast in lead roles as Spike Spiegel, Jet Black, Faye Valentine and Vicious in the series. On August 22, 2019, it was announced that Elena Satine was cast as Julia. On November 19, 2020, Deadline Hollywood reported that Geoff Stults, Tamara Tunie, Mason Alexander Park, Rachel House, Ann Truong and Hoa Xuande have been cast as Chalmers, Ana, Gren, Mao, Shin and Lin. James Hiroyuki Liao had joined the cast by August 2021, along with Blessing Mokgohloa as Santiago and Molly Moriarty as Kimmie Black. On September 25, 2021, Jan Uddin and Lydia Peckham, Adrienne Barbeau, Josh Randall, Rodney Cook, and Ira Munn and Lucy Currey were officially cast as Asimov and Katerina Solensan, Maria Murdock, Pierrot Le Fou, Teddy Bomber, and Punch and Judy. Cali Nelle was also confirmed to play Abdul Hakim.

When Cho came across the project, he remarked about the anime, "It's really interesting and smart and funny...All the characters are coming from places of loss, and there are a lot of defense mechanisms to deal with that sense of loss that informs the whole show." He continued, "I investigated the anime and just thought this was the most unique piece of entertainment I had seen in a long time: the combination of genres, characters, the music." He later called Aneesh Chaganty, director of Searching, to talk about the project. Cho remembered that Chaganty encouraged him saying, "You have to do it.”

On October 27, 2021, in an interview with SyFy Wire, Nemec explained he purposely cast older actors and defended his choice that it would build richer stories for the characters, saying, "I think that really became clear to me that to really feel for these characters, to really want to track and live with them, they needed real depth of life experience in their soul. And that was something that John brought. I can't imagine anyone being Spike Spiegel but John Cho because John brings a depth to the character. He's incredibly facile with humor. He's quick-witted. He can be laconic like Spike Spiegel. I think the anime had true moments of ennui, and true moments of dramatic pain that really did require someone, again, with that depth that John brought. While in the anime, it's okay to sort of play the younger version. But in today's world and in live action, the actor needed to be able to bring that essence as well. And that just required a more mature actor."

Several of the original Japanese voice actors from the anime are involved in the live action adaption, reprising their roles for the Japanese dub of the show and there will be an addition of a few new voice actors. The Japanese voice actor for Spike, Kōichi Yamadera said, "I have long anticipated a live action version. I can feel the strong respect it has toward the anime. I hope that viewers will see the atmosphere of the Spike character that I previously portrayed in John Cho's performance, who is skillfully taking on the role in this version. There are also many settings and developments that can only be pulled off in a live action series. I hope that both people who love Cowboy Bebop and those who are new to the title can enjoy this new series!"

The casting of newcomer Eden Perkins as Radical Ed was announced on the day of the series' release to Netflix, though only appears in the final scenes of the tenth episode. According to Nemec, "To keep the mystery around the character was to not necessarily want to promise that this was going to be a season that was inclusive of Ed, to not necessarily put something that many may find is disappointing out into the world. But in fairness, Ed doesn't show up in the anime until many episodes in, maybe about a third of the way through the entire series. So, it felt fair to also keep Ed from showing up [in live-action]."

Pre-production 
Nemec and the writers also looked beyond the source material to the movies that influenced the original anime director, Shinichirō Watanabe when developing the anime with studio Sunrise in the 1990s. The Netflix Cowboy Bebop team researched Howard Hawks' The Big Sleep (1946), the classic Sergio Leone spaghetti Western The Good, the Bad and the Ugly (1966), the New Hollywood classic Bonnie and Clyde (1967), Stanley Kubrick's 2001: A Space Odyssey (1968), the neo-noir action thriller Dirty Harry (1971), as well as buddy cop comedy Lethal Weapon (1987), and even the macabre action drama The Crow (1994) to represent Cowboy Bebop through the reality of cinema. "We put a pretty extensive and expansive list together, and we spent a lot of time really looking at the inspirations," Nemec said. The showrunner did not watch much other anime or even live-action anime adaptations in preparation for the show.

Nemec also stated that it was important to  be faithful to source material and also carve their own story for the live action adaptation. He mentioned, "I think a lot of it was that there were so many things that work [in the anime] but at the same time, not wanting to do a one-to-one translation because I wanted to be served, if I were a fan, a different meal."

Regarding on Faye Valentine's wardrobe changes, Pineda stated, "You know, we tried with the original. But in the original outfit, which is so lovely, it's hard to hide stunt pads and gel pads and back plates and things you need when you're falling and kicking and doing stunts." She worked with head of costume design Jane Holland to figure out a functioning outfit for the character in real life. Holland stated, "I do have to say, as a woman, I felt resistant to the idea of the lead female character being gratuitous or overtly sexualized. It's not about it not being revealing, it's not about any of that, it's actually got all of those elements. But my take on it is that it's designed by a woman and it was made by a lot of women, and it's worn by a woman. So the same elements are there but they have just manifested in a different way." Holland also mentioned it would be easier for Pineda to work in this outfit than if she was dressed how Faye is in the anime. The costume designer said, "It's definitely aesthetically driven but there's a practical element as well...There's a lot of action. we filmed over a long period of time through different seasons. We had a lot of night shifts in Oakland so Jet and Spike were fine, because they had practical, much more practical clothing, in the anime. [Pineda] needed that as well."

The cast initially trained with 87eleven Action Design, the same stunt team of the film franchise, John Wick. They later worked with New Zealander stunt coordinator Allan Poppleton of Cunning Stunts on Cowboy Bebop.

Filming 
Filming for the series took place in 185 locations around Auckland, New Zealand between July 2019 and March 2021 including the former Auckland Railway Station, Ardmore Airport, St Matthew's Church, Spark Arena, Waitawa Regional Park, and Kingsland railway station. 150 locals were involved in the series' art and construction teams. According to production manager Clayton Tikao, Auckland was picked since its urban environment fitted with the series' "grottier" aesthetic.

In October 2019, Cho sustained a knee injury, which set back production by about eight months. Cho's injury and delay also gave the showrunners extra time to bring in some of the planned second season elements into the first season, such as introducing characters and casting for them. This included introducing Mason Alexander Park as Gren, who originally was introduced in the thirteenth episode of the series.

On April 17, 2020, further news was provided about the project, that episodes would be one-hour in length allowing for more in-depth storytelling, and second season script has been noted as a possibility. On May 19, 2020, in an interview with SyFy Wire, Adelstein revealed that three episodes had already been completed, and that they had shot at least six before Cho's knee injury. During the same interview, it was also revealed that the director of the anime series, Shinichirō Watanabe, would be involved as a creative consultant. Watanabe later stated in November 2019, “I read the initial concept and provided my opinions, but I'm not sure if they will be reflected in the final product. I have no choice but to pray and hope that it will turn out good. Also, for Cowboy Bebop, I don't have any right to stop it. Those rights are in the hands of Sunrise, so if you have a complaint, please send it to them.” In October 2021, Entertainment Weekly confirmed that Watanabe had served as a consultant for the series. He provided production with early Cowboy Bebop concept art for reference. Sunrise provided books, which are original character concept drawings, ships, props, sets, and locations for the team to use as references. Watanabe stated, "For me, it's a great surprise and honor that the Cowboy Bebop universe has thrived for over 20 years and will continue onward." When Nemec is directly asked about Watanabe in interviews, he only mentioned Sunrise staff.

Production resumed on September 30, 2020, after the New Zealand government gave the green light to continue following the nation's COVID-19 shutdown. Filming officially wrapped on March 15, 2021. In August 2021, it was revealed that original show creator Hajime Yatate, actually a pseudonym for the collective Sunrise animation staff, was interested in writing episodes of the series.

Elena Satine, who played Julia, was pregnant during filming.

Music 
Yoko Kanno is the composer for the series while "Tank!" played in the series' opening credits. In an August 2021 interview with the Vulture magazine, Cho mentioned about accepting his role and Kanno's involvement with the live action adaptation, "I made sure that she was locked in before saying yes. I didn't think the show should go forward without her involvement. [She is] too integral to the show. Our iteration minus her would suffer too much." On September 8, 2021, Nemec stated in a Polygon interview, "Yoko's involvement in this show to me was paramount to almost everything else."

Release 
A first look video, from the point-of-view of Ein, was released by Netflix in October 2019. Set to music from the original series, the clip showed off some of the sets and the main cast, with the trademark sign-off phrase "See You Space Cowboy..." appearing at the end. Netflix resumed the show's marketing campaign in June 2021 with a new teaser set to the original show's opening theme, "Tank!", to announce that Kanno would be scoring the series after having previously provided the soundtrack for the 1998 anime. In August 2021, along with the reveal of a November release date, Netflix released first-look preview images for the show, including pictures of Spike, Jet, Faye and Ein in various environments recreated from the anime, including the Bebop spaceship and the cathedral where Vicious and Spike had their first confrontation. During Netflix's TUDUM event, they revealed the show's opening credits which replicate the anime's opening incorporating "Tank!" and including live action recreations of the original. It took 3 days to film.

A special standalone teaser called "The Lost Session", shot separately from and not including any footage from the actual show, was released by Netflix on October 19, 2021 in anticipation for the trailer release. Directed by Greg Jardin, the short featured Cho, Shakir, and Pineda as their respective characters. The first official trailer was released by Netflix on October 26, 2021.

The series was originally slated to release in 2020, but was delayed due to Cho's injury and the COVID-19 pandemic. It was released on November 19, 2021.

The series was canceled after one season on December 9, 2021, less than three weeks after its release. According to insiders, Netflix's renewal rate for a scripted series is at 60 percent and their decision is based on balancing the show's viewership and cost. Although Cowboy Bebop was on Netflix's Top 10 with almost 74 million viewing hours worldwide since its debut, viewership dropped by 59 percent the following week from November 29, 2021 to December 5, 2021.

Season 2 storylines 
In The Bebop Beat podcast interview, showrunner André Nemec discussed what would have happened during a second season, including: the reveal of the Cosmonaut; Ed finding out the true meaning of family; Jet's mechanical arm tripping out; while Jet is tripping out, his arm is unusable and plays the saxophone with one hand; Spike's demons of the Blue Crow massacre being put to bed; Faye finding out who she is; Julia discovering "Heavy is The Head That Wears The Crown"; Vicious being reborn and Ein saving the day.

Reception

Critical response
Critical response to the series was described as "mixed", and "negative". On review aggregator Rotten Tomatoes, the series has an approval rating of 46% based on 81 critics, with an average rating of 5.9/10. The website's critics consensus reads, "Maybe next time, Space Cowboy — this live-action Bebop has a fun enough crew to spend time with, but it disappointingly replaces the soulfulness of the source material with kitsch." According to Metacritic, which calculated an average score of 47 out of 100 from 28 reviews, the series received "mixed or average reviews".

Total Films Bradley Russell gave the series four stars out of five, stating that the show is "overflowing with charm, personality, and style – becoming a worthy companion piece to the original series". Matt Kim of IGN felt that the show "whole-heartedly embraces its source material and succeeds more often than it fails." Rolling Stones Alan Sepinwall described the series as "a hangout show as much as it is a thriller, a space opera, and so on", ultimately giving it three-and-a-half stars out of five. Nina Metz of the Chicago Tribune felt that "if you're able to watch [the series] with eyes unencumbered by comparisons, it's a hoot".

Many reviewers felt the series did not live up to the original series. Kambole Campbell of Empire gave Cowboy Bebop two stars out of five, declaring it "a hollow re-enactment" of the anime. Entertainment Weeklys Christian Holub described the series as "a lot less embarrassing" than previous live-action anime adaptations, while also noting that "it still doesn't quite live up to the power of the original series". Mike Hale of The New York Times also said the show can't live up to the original because of its "resolute ordinariness". Maureen Ryan of Vanity Fair however said that "This version of Cowboy Bebop, in many ways, improves on the original."

The series was heavily criticized for its writing and pacing by many reviewers. Cecilia D'Anastasio writing in Wired described the writing as "corny writing and muddled subplots". Russell felt that many of the supporting characters' motivations were "glossed over and occasionally undercooked", while "a handful of episodes feel rushed to meet its runtime". He also noted that the Vicious–Julia subplot was "by far the weakest element" of the show. Several reviewers noted how the increased episode length did not translate into better episodes, but instead bloat. Judy Berman writing in Time magazine called the decision to expand the show from 25 minutes to an hour "baffling". Variety's Caroline Framke opined that the series suffered from "Netflix bloat", where the story is needlessly stretched "seemingly for the sake of retaining eyeballs for more minutes at a time". Rob Owen of the Pittsburgh Tribune-Review wrote, "When the show leans more heavily into Spike's serialized plot – Cowboy Bebop loses its sense of fun and bogs down in tired soap operatics."

The show's visual aesthetic polarized critics. Rohan Naaha of The Indian Express wrote that the show "apes only the most obvious aspects of the cartoon — the aesthetic. But funnily enough, it never comes across as a show that is mimicking Westerns or noir films; it comes across as a show that is mimicking another show's impression of what Westerns and noir films are." He also criticized the excessive use of dutch angles. D'Anastasio was critical of the sets and described them as "cheap-looking. Russell, meanwhile, noted that "some sets clearly need a more sizeable budget, but the sheer attention to detail by the production designers helps overcome that handicap". Graeme Virtue of The Guardian described the show as a "visually amped-up space western that feels stylised and swaggering to near saturation". Sepinwall wrote, "The visual palette is a blend of high and low elements, blending modern special effects with Fifties-style green screen in a way that looks simultaneously primitive and cool, so even the sequences that seem cheap pop off the screen in appealing ways." Conversely, The Hollywood Reporter's Angie Han described the show as "a knockoff Firefly, made for a fraction of the budget", with "muddy CG" and "shoddy-looking sets". Hale compared the show's visual effects to Doctor Who, calling them adequate but cheesy.

Several reviewers also criticized the action scenes for their cinematography, editing and fight choreography. However, Brian Lowry of CNN described the action sequences in the series "stylishly choreographed" despite the overall series was lacking and dull.

Critics, including those who criticized the series, praised the performances of the cast. Naaha described the cast as the "only saving grace" of the series in an otherwise critical review. Francisco stated, "If there's a high mark the show hits, it's the fact that its all-star main cast was successfully assembled to begin with." Shirley Li of The Atlantic wrote, "The trio of protagonists aboard the Bebop have an electric chemistry: The actor John Cho embodies Spike's swagger, Mustafa Shakir captures Jet's stoicism, and Daniella Pineda suffuses Faye with endearing candor." GameSpots Mason Downey wrote, "absolutely everyone feels perfectly cast".

Audience reaction 
When it was announced Cowboy Bebop would not receive a second season on December 9, 2021, there were mixed reactions. However, this also prompted a petition called "Save the live action Cowboy Bebop." Science fiction author Wesley Chu tweeted a link after comparing the show to Firefly. The petition gained over 150,000 signatures including Steve Blum, the English voice actor for Spike in the anime, who has been very supportive of the live action and cast.

Creator response
Shinichiro Watanabe was asked by Forbes magazine what he thought of the live-action adaptation, to which he responded, "For the new Netflix live-action adaptation, they sent me a video to review and check. It started with a scene in a casino, which made it very tough for me to continue. I stopped there and so only saw that opening scene. It was clearly not Cowboy Bebop and I realized at that point that if I wasn't involved, it would not be Cowboy Bebop. I felt that maybe I should have done this. Although the value of the original anime is somehow far higher now."

Awards and nominations 
The series was nominated for Outstanding Main Title Design at the 74th Primetime Creative Arts Emmy Awards in 2022.

Other media 
In August 2021, it was announced that Netflix had partnered with Titan Books to publish several books based on the series, with the first book, a prequel novel entitled Cowboy Bebop: A Syndicate Story: Red Planet Requiem, released on December 7, 2021. An art book, Cowboy Bebop: Making The Netflix Series, which has concept art, behind-the-scenes photography, and cast and crew interviews, was released on June 21, 2022.

Titan also published a four-issue comic miniseries based on the show from January 26 to June 22, 2022, with a trade collecting all four issues released on November 15, as Cowboy Bebop: Supernova Swing. The story is by Dan Watters and art by Lamar Mathurin. First issue art cover is by Artgerm (Stanley Lau) with variant covers by Claudia Ianniciello, Afu Chan, and Yishan Li. The following issues continued to have different cover artists.

References

External links 
 
 

2020s American drama television series
2020s American science fiction television series
2021 American television series debuts
2021 American television series endings
Cowboy Bebop
English-language Netflix original programming
Neo-noir television series
Post-apocalyptic television series
Television series set in the 22nd century
Television shows filmed in New Zealand
Television series by ITV Studios
Television productions postponed due to the COVID-19 pandemic
Works based on animated television series
Space Western television series